Mary Wells Greatest Hits is a greatest-hits compilation album released by Motown singer Mary Wells in 1964 on the Motown label. As the standout early star of Motown Records, Wells, thanks to producers such as Berry Gordy and Smokey Robinson, rose to prominence as Motown's first crossover star for a brief period between 1961 and 1964 before she left the label that year for 20th Century Fox Records. This collection collected the best of Wells' hits with the label.

Track listing

Side one
"The One Who Really Loves You"
"You Beat Me to the Punch"
"Two Lovers"
"Your Old Standby"
"What's Easy for Two Is So Hard for One"
"My Guy"

Side two
"Laughing Boy"
"What Love Has Joined Together"
"Oh Little Boy (What Did You Do to Me)"
"Old Love (Let's Try Again)"
"You Lost the Sweetest Boy"
"Bye Bye Baby"

Personnel
Mary Wells - lead vocals
 Liz Lands - background vocals
The Rayber Voices - background vocals
The Love Tones - background vocals
The Andantes - background vocals
The Supremes - background vocals
The Temptations - background vocals
The Funk Brothers - instrumentation

Mary Wells albums
Albums produced by Smokey Robinson
Albums produced by Berry Gordy
1966 greatest hits albums
Motown compilation albums
Albums produced by William "Mickey" Stevenson